Seh Chah (also Romanized as Seh Chāh) is a village in Shahr Meyan Rural District, in the Central District of Eqlid County, Fars Province, Iran. At the 2006 census, its population was 119, in 22 families.

References 

Populated places in Eqlid County